DiY Sound System, also known as the DiY Collective, was a British house music sound system that formed in 1989. The group "divided their activities between free parties and legal club nights, acting as a bridge between counter-culture and the mainstream".

History
The DiY Collective was founded in Nottingham in 1989 as a reaction against the growing commercialisation of pay parties, especially Orbital raves such as Biology and Sunrise. DiY's standpoint came from a merging of anarchist principles and a history of attending both free festivals and clubs such as the Haçienda. They wished to form a cohesive, collective, political front against the prevailing anti-rave legislation that was beginning to come into force at that time. This became more marked around the time of the Criminal Justice and Public Order Act 1994, with DiY playing a key role in the illegal rave at Castlemorton Common Festival prior to the Bill in May 1992. After hooking up with a group of progressive travellers at the 1990 Glastonbury Festival, they began to throw a constant stream of illegal, outdoor parties (often at travellers' sites, quarries and disused airfields) all over the country for many years. Simon Reynolds wrote that DiY threw "free parties at abandoned airfields or on hilltops, drawing a mixed crowd of urban ravers and crusty road warriors".

DiY also worked in the realm of legitimate club nights, starting with their first night at the Kool Kat, Nottingham on 23 November 1989 on Harry's 23rd birthday. Their "Bounce" began at Venus, Nottingham in February 1991 and ran for five years at various clubs, including nights at the Dance Factory. Bounce also at one point had a network of nights in Liverpool, Manchester, Hull, Sheffield, Bristol, Birmingham, Exeter and Bath.

The Strictly 4 Groovers label put out its first release by Alabama 3 in 1992, followed by records from members of the DiY Collective, as well local artists including Atjazz, Rhythm Plate and Charles Webster, later changing the label's name to DiVersions and going on to release over 80 12 inchers, CD's and LP's (see Discogs for full discography).  .

DiY continue to hold occasional free parties, typically to celebrate a milestone date—on 19 September 2009, DiY celebrated their 20th birthday with a free party near their home town of Nottingham, and on 23 August 2014, their 25th birthday with a free party held in a field in Leicestershire.

On 3 October 2020, it was announced that Pete Birch (DJ Woosh aka the Peaceful Ones) had died from cancer. Despite Covid restrictions, a wake was held in Nottingham and a ceremony was held at Prestwold Natural Burial Ground where he is interred. In May 2021 a birch tree was planted on his grave. This was followed later in the year by the publication of 'Dreaming in Yellow', an autobiographical story of the history of DiY by founder member Harry Harrison, published by Velocity Press on March 23rd 2022.

See also
Exodus Collective
Free party
Spiral Tribe
Teknival

References

Further reading
Dreaming in Yellow: the story of the DiY Sound System. By Harry Harrison. Velocity, 2022. .

External links

Sound systems
British electronic musicians
Collectives
Counterculture festivals activists
Rave culture in the United Kingdom
English house musicians
House musicians
Musical groups from Nottingham